Yerzhan Tatishev (Erjan Nureldaıymuly Tátishev; 22 April 1967 – 19 December 2004) was Kazakhstani banker who was the chairman and CEO of BTA Bank JSC.

In December 2004, the 37-year-old Tatishev died of a gunshot wound sustained while driving in the Jambyl Region. 

Months after his death, the U.S. State Department listed three theories behind the cause of Tatishev's death: hunting accident; elimination by economic rivals; and politically motivated killing. Kazakh businessman Muratkhan Tokmadi initially claimed to have shot him accidentally while hunting and was sentenced to one year in prison after being convicted of manslaughter. However, the case was re-opened in 2017, after he confessed in a documentary to deliberately murdering Tatishev after being paid to do so by ex-oligarch Mukhtar Ablyazov.  In March 2018, Tokmadi was sentenced to 10 1/2 years in prison. Ablyazov, who resides in France, is already wanted in Kazakhstan, Russia, and Ukraine for financial crimes.

He was born in Turbat, in the Kazygurt District in Turkistan Region of southern Kazakhstan. He graduated from the Moscow Institute of Applied Biotechnology with a degree in engineering and technology in 1991. He earned a master's degree in economics from the Kazakh State Academy of Management.

References

1967 births
2004 deaths
Bank presidents and chief executive officers
Kazakhstani bankers
People murdered in Kazakhstan